The 104th Wellesley's Rifles were an infantry regiment of the British Indian Army. They could trace their origins to 1775, when they were raised as the 5th Battalion, Bombay Sepoys and presently its designation is 3 Guards (1 Rajputana Rifles) of Indian Army.

The regiments first action was during the Mysore Campaign in the Third Anglo-Mysore War. This was followed by their participation in the Battle of Seringapatam in the Fourth Anglo-Mysore War. They were next called to serve in the Beni Boo Ali campaign in 1821, against the pirates in Eastern Arabia and the Persian Gulf region. Returning to India they took part in the Siege of Multan during the Second Anglo-Sikh War. They were next involved in the Anglo-Persian War in 1856, followed the next year by the Indian Rebellion of 1857 taking part in the Central India Campaign.

Twenty years were to pass until their next action in the Battle of Kandahar during the Second Afghan War. They were also in East Africa during the Sudan Campaign. During World War I they were in the 6th (Poona) Division during the Mesopotamia Campaign.
After a string of early successes particularly during the Battle of Es Sinn, the 6th Division was defeated at the Battle of Ctesiphon in November 1915. Following this engagement, the division withdrew to Kut and Siege of Kut began. After a lengthy siege all they surrendered in April 1916.

After World War I the Indian government reformed the army moving from single battalion regiments to multi battalion regiments. In 1922, the 104th Wellesley's Rifles became the 1st Battalion 6th Rajputana Rifles. After independence they were one of the regiments allocated to the Indian Army.

Predecessor names
5th Battalion, Bombay Sepoys - 1775
9th Battalion, Bombay Sepoys - 1778
2nd Battalion, 2nd Regiment of Bombay Native Infantry - 1796
4th Bombay Native Infantry - 1824
4th Bombay Infantry (or Rifle Corps) - 1885
4th (1st Battalion Rifle Corps) Bombay Infantry - 1889
4th Bombay Rifles - 1901
104th Wellesley's Rifles - 1903

Successor Names
1st Battalion 6th Rajputana Rifles-1921
1st Battalion Rajputana Rifles-1945
Allocated to India on Partition-1947
3rd Battalion, Brigade of the Guards(1st Rajputana Rifles)-1949

References
Notes

Bibliography

 https://www.amazon.in/s?i=stripbooks&rh=p_27%3AO+B+E+M+C+Lieut+Colonel+F+H+James

Moberly, F.J. (1923). Official History of the War: Mesopotamia Campaign, Imperial War Museum. 

British Indian Army infantry regiments
Bombay Presidency
Military units and formations established in 1775